The 2015 Segunda División B play-offs (Playoffs de Ascenso or Promoción de Ascenso) are the final playoffs for promotion from 2014–15 Segunda División B to the 2015–16 Segunda División. The four first placed teams in each of the four Segunda División B groups join the Playoffs de Ascenso and the four last placed teams in Segunda División will be relegated to Segunda División B. It also decides the teams which placed 16th to be relegated to the 2015–16 Tercera División.

Format
The four group winners have the opportunity to promote directly and become the overall Segunda División B champion. The four group winners will be drawn into a two-legged series where the two winners will be promoted to the Segunda División and will enter into the final for the Segunda División B champion. The two losing semifinalists will enter the playoff round for the last two promotion spots.

The four group runners-up will be drawn against one of the three fourth-placed teams outside their group while the four third-placed teams will be drawn against each other in a two-legged series. The six winners will advance with the two losing semifinalists to determine the four teams that will enter the last two-legged series for the last two promotion spots. In all the playoff series, the lower-ranked club will play at home first. Whenever there is a tie in position (e.g. like the group winners in the Semifinal Round and Final or the third-placed teams in the first round), a draw will determine the club to play at home first.

Group Winners promotion play-off

Qualified teams 
The draw was held in the RFEF headquarters, in Las Rozas (Madrid), on 18 May 2015, 17:00 CEST.

Matches

Semifinals

|}

First leg

Second leg

Final

|}

First leg

Second leg

Non-champions promotion play-off

First round

Qualified teams
The draw was held in the RFEF headquarters, in Las Rozas (Madrid).

Matches

|}

First leg

Second leg

Second round

Qualified teams
The draw was held in the RFEF headquarters, in Las Rozas (Madrid).

Matches

|}

First leg

Second leg

Third round

Qualified teams
The draw was held in the RFEF headquarters, in Las Rozas (Madrid).

Matches

|}

First leg

Second leg

Relegation play-off

Qualified teams
The draw was held in the RFEF headquarters, in Las Rozas (Madrid).

Matches

|}

First leg

Second leg

See also 
 2014–15 Segunda División B

References 

Segunda División B play-offs
2015 Spanish football leagues play-offs
2014–15 Segunda División B